Haile (Ge'ez "the power of") may refer to:

People with the given name Haile
 Haile Selassie of Ethiopia (1892–1975), Emperor of Ethiopia
 Haile Gerima (born 1946), Ethiopian filmmaker
 Haile Gebrselassie (born 1973), Ethiopian distance runner
 Haile Yosadiq, warlord of the Zemene Mesafint
 Haile Maryam, another warlord of the Zemene Mesafint, and father of Wube Haile Maryam
 Haile, the lead singer of British R&B trio WSTRN
 Haile Kifer, victim in the Byron David Smith killings

Other
Haile (surname)
Haile (robot), a robotic musician

Places
Haile, Cumbria, a place in Cumbria, England
Haile Homestead, a historic site in Alachua County, FL.
Haile Plantation, Florida, an unincorporated community in Alachua County, FL -- located near Gainesville, FL.
Haile, FL, another unincorporated community near Newberry, FL.

See also
Hale (disambiguation)
Hailu
Yemane Haileselassie (born 1998), Eritrean steeplechase runner
Yohannes Haile-Selassie (born 1961), Ethiopian paleoanthropologist

Amharic-language names